Tauras Jogėla (born 2 May 1993) is a Lithuanian professional basketball player for Soproni KC. Jogėla can play either forward position, although he's more accustomed to playing power forward. He won the Lithuanian Student Basketball League (MKL) Slam Dunk Contest in 2011.

Jogėla averaged 14 points and 4.5 rebounds per game for Soproni KC during the 2019-20 season. He re-signed with the team on 26 July 2020.

International career
Jogėla won a silver medal with Lithuania national basketball team at the 2009 Europe U-16 championship and was named the championship MVP.

References

External links
 Tauras Jogėla NKLsmscredit.lt profile

1993 births
Living people
BC Lietkabelis players
BC Nevėžis players
BC Pieno žvaigždės players
BC Prienai players
BC Žalgiris players
BC Žalgiris-2 players
BK Barons players
CSU Pitești players
Lithuanian men's basketball players
People from Tauragė
Forwards (basketball)